Brian Treece (born May 11, 1969) is an American politician who was the Mayor of Columbia, Missouri, serving two consecutive terms in office from 2016–2022. Before becoming mayor Treece was chairman of the Downtown Leadership Council and served on the city's Historic Preservation Committee. He and his wife Mary Phillips founded the lobbying firm TreecePhillips in Jefferson City, Missouri. In 2011, they married at their home in Columbia. In the 2016 municipal election he defeated lawyer Skip Walther. In the April 2, 2019 mayoral election he defeated former Missouri State Representative Chris Kelly. He was an advocate for transparency in government and called for a city-wide audit. Treece announced the hiring of Columbia's newest city manager John Glascock on July 15, 2019. He has described himself as a "fiscal conservative." As Mayor, he served as chair of the Columbia City Council. He did not seek reelection in the 2022 election.

References

1969 births
21st-century American politicians
Mayors of Columbia, Missouri
Living people
Missouri city council members
University of Missouri alumni